Urorchis is a genus of trematodes in the family Opecoelidae.

Species
Urorchis acheilognathi Yamaguti, 1934
Urorchis goro Ozaki, 1927
Urorchis imba Ishii, 1935

References

Opecoelidae
Plagiorchiida genera